Get Wild is the debut EP by Max M, self-released in 1992. The song "Ain't Life a Mother..." as later released on Max M's full-length studio album debut Technology Is God.

Track listing

Personnel
Adapted from the Get Wild liner notes.

Max M
 Max Møller Rasmussen – vocals, instruments, producer, design

Additional performers
 Carsten Lassen – live guitar

Production and design
 Sebastian D. Tingkær – cover art, photography

Release history

References

External links 
 
 Get Wild at Discogs (list of releases)

1992 debut EPs
Max M albums